Simukonda is a surname. Notable people with the surname include:

Ambwene Simukonda (born 1984), Malawian sprinter
Andy Simukonda (born 1992), Malawian football player
Fighton Simukonda (1958–2016), Zambian football player and coach
Zachariah Simukonda (born 1983), Zambian football player